Selim Noujaim was a member of the Connecticut House of Representatives.  He is the Executive Vice President of Noujaim Tools.

Biography
Noujaim was born on November 25, 1948. Noujaim emigrated to the United States in 1974 from Lebanon, and is Catholic . He graduated from Post University, Central Connecticut State University and the University of New Haven.

Political career
Noujaim was first elected to the House of Representatives in 2002. He is a Republican.

Community involvement

Representative Noujaim has served as Chairman of the Board of Directors of Seven Angels Theater; Chairman of Saints Peter and Paul Church Parish Council; Chairman of the Economic Development and Manufacturer's Councils; and as the President of the Maassir Lebanese-American Charitable Society. He also co-chaired the 2001-2002 United Way Campaign Cabinet and is a former member of the Workforce Connections/Private Industry Council.

Representative Noujaim has been a member of the Smaller Manufacturers Association (SMA) and was the 2005 Honorary Chairman of the Relay of Life for the American Cancer Society. He also is a former member of the President's Council of Naugatuck Valley Community Technical College; and a former member of the Board of Sacred Heart High School.

Representative Noujaim has been honored for his community service over the years. He has received The Distinguished Alumni Award from Teikyo Post University; the Merit Award from the Board of Trustees of Community-Technical Colleges of Connecticut; the 1998 Board Award from Workforce Connections; and the Saints Peter and Paul Medal of Honor of 2003.

Representative Noujaim also has been chosen as the City of Waterbury's 'Lebanese Mayor for the Day.' In addition, he is often invited to serve as Master of Ceremonies for charitable events in Waterbury.

The Greater Waterbury Chamber of Commerce named Noujaim Tool Company, Inc. Small Manufacturer of the Year in 1998. That same year, Representative Noujaim received the Leadership in Business Award for his contributions to the manufacturing profession. In 1999, the Anderson Boys Club honored him with its Humanitarian Award. He was listed in the 1997, 1998, and 1999 editions of "Who's Who In International Business Professionals."

In March 2003, Noujaim received the Mayor Raymond Snyder Award from the Waterbury Republican Town Committee for excellence in public service; and in April 2004 he was honored by the Central Naugatuck Valley Senior Service Network for his dedication to senior issues.

In April 2009, Noujaim received the Dennis M. Buckley Award for excellence in service by an elected official, and in the same month he was honored by the Father Dwyer Humanitarian award given by the Children's Community School for to his services to underprivileged children.

In May 2009, Noujaim was presented with a "Children's Champion" award by the Connecticut Early Childhood Alliance. The award recognizes his "commitment to early childhood issues" in his district in Waterbury's East End and at the State Capitol.

In November 2009, Noujaim was awarded the Maureen A. Donahoe Life Award by Carolyn's Place, a crisis pregnancy center, for his steadfast work promoting a socially conservative agenda in the legislature.

In March 2011, Noujaim was given the first Connecticut Reading Association's Legislative Literacy Advocate Award from CRA President Sandy Mangan during an awards ceremony at the capitol. The award honors a legislator who has been helpful in advocating and supporting literacy at the state and local level.

In April 2013, Noujaim was awarded the Community Service Award from the Waterbury Sportsmen's Club during their annual awards dinner at the Aqua Turf Club in Southington.

In 2015, he was named Legislator of the Year by the Connecticut Carwash Association, and Community Partner of the Year by Girls Inc. in Waterbury.  Noujaim was also inducted into the Post University Hall of Fame during a ceremony in April, 2015.

References

Republican Party members of the Connecticut House of Representatives
Central Connecticut State University alumni
University of New Haven alumni
Post University alumni
1948 births
Living people
American politicians of Lebanese descent
21st-century American politicians
Lebanese emigrants to the United States